Hammer is the third album by German rapper Afrob, released in February 2005 by Four Music. It was produced by many famous producers like Needlz, Jaz-O and Waajeed.

Track listing

Album singles

References

2005 albums